Perotrochus anseeuwi is a species of large sea snail, a marine gastropod mollusk in the family Pleurotomariidae, the slit snails.

Description

Distribution
This marine species occurs off the Philippines.

References

External links
 To Encyclopedia of Life
 To USNM Invertebrate Zoology Mollusca Collection
 To World Register of Marine Species
 

Pleurotomariidae
Gastropods described in 1991